New Jenny Lind is an unincorporated community in Sebastian County, Arkansas, United States.

History
New Jenny Lind was named for the Swedish opera singer Jenny Lind.

References

Unincorporated communities in Sebastian County, Arkansas
Unincorporated communities in Arkansas